Livanjsko polje, located in Bosnia and Herzegovina, is the largest polje (karstic field) in the world. A typical example of karst polje encircled by tall peaks and mountain ranges, the field is characterized by many unique natural phenomenons and karstic features.

Geography 
The field has an area of 45,868 hectare, 458.7 km², and an average width of 6 km. It is located at an average height of 720 m above sea level.

The field is located in region of Tropolje, in the southwest of Bosnia and Herzegovina, and lies between the karstic mountains of Dinara and Kamešnica on the south, Tušnica mountain on the east, Cincar and Golija mountain on the north and Šator and Staretina mountain on the west. Buško Blato (Buško lake) lies to the southeast, and Ždralovac to the northwest. Ždralovac is a narrow corridor by which the Livno field is connected to the Grahovsko field, between the slopes of mountains Dinara, Kamešnica and Šator.

Climate 
In the Neolithic age, the field was underwater. On the field itself there remains several lakes, of which Buško Blato has the largest accumulation in the region. Brežinsko jezero is another lake of note which lies on the northwest part of the field. When the Orlovac Hydroelectric power-plant was built in the 1960s, it altered the climate of the entire Livno region. Long, cold winter months with large snowfalls with the characteristic bura wind, were replaced by rainy winters and long, warm summers.

Hydrology and hydrography 
Across the Livanjsko field flow several rivers, which belong to the Adriatic watershed. The most important of these are the Žabljak, the Sturba, the Bistrica, the Brina, the Plovuča, the Jaruga and the Ričina which are all rich in trout and crab. An artificial lake, Buško Blato, was dammed in the polje in the 1970s for electric power generation. Additional projects are in planning which could seriously compromise the delicate hydrological balance of the Dinaric karst, which is criss-crossed by underground rivers.

Towns and villages 
The largest town on the field is Livno, from which the field received its name. The town of Livno has approximately 12,000 inhabitants. It is located on the northeastern part of the field, beneath mount Bašajkovac.

The largest villages on the field are Guber, Grborezi, Podhum, Prolog, Čuklić, Zabrišće, Bila, Čelebić, Lusnić, Strupnić, Kovačić, Vrbica and Bojmunte.

Culture and history 
Old Livno fortress (Bistrica town), the historic site

Organic agriculture and cuisine 
The field is home to continental vegetable culture such as potatoes and cabbage. Livestock, especially raising cattle and sheep, as well as the production of milk and two famous brand of delicacy cheese, simply known as Livanjski cheese and Cincar cheese, employs a good deal of the inhabitants of the field.

See also 
 Popovo Polje
 Livanjski cheese
 Cincar cheese

References

External links

 REC Transboundary Cooperation Through the Management of Shared Natural Resources
 INWEB Internationally Shared Surface Water Bodies in the Balkan Region
 Ramsar Convention on Wetlands
 Bosnia and Herzegovina Commission for Preservation of National Monuments
 Wine route Herzegovina
 Hutovo Blato Nature Park
 Hutovo Blato Nature Park — Network of Adriatic Parks

Karst fields of Bosnia and Herzegovina
Geology of Bosnia and Herzegovina
Field
Mountains of Bosnia and Herzegovina
Ramsar sites in Bosnia and Herzegovina
Important Bird Areas of Bosnia and Herzegovina
Livanjsko polje
Buško Blato basin